Between the Knees is a 1984 South Korean erotic drama film about a young woman with a traumatizing past. She grows to be a talented musician, with a fiancé. However, events from her and her family's past come back to haunt her in more ways than one.

Cast
 Ahn Sung-ki
 Lee Bo-hee
 Yim Sung-min
 Lee Hye-young
 Na Han-il
 Gang Jae-il
 Kim In-moon
 Tae Hyun-sil
 Kim Tae-hwan
 Park Yeong-ro

Reception
The film achieved huge success, and ranked number 2 in success in 1984.

References

External links
 
 

1984 films
South Korean erotic drama films
1980s erotic drama films
Films directed by Lee Jang-ho
1984 drama films